Michal Mareš (born 3 February 1976), is a Czech futsal player who plays for Era-Pack Chrudim and the Czech Republic national futsal team.

References

External links
UEFA profile
Futsalplanet profile

1976 births
Living people
Czech men's futsal players
Sportspeople from Prague